Eldorado do Sul is a municipality in the state of Rio Grande do Sul, Brazil. It is located in the metropolitan area of Porto Alegre, the state's capital and largest city, opposite the capital on the right bank of Guaíba River. Population: 41,902 (est. 2020).

See also
List of municipalities in Rio Grande do Sul

References

Municipalities in Rio Grande do Sul